Calyptra canadensis, the Canadian owlet or meadow rue owlet moth, is a moth of the family Erebidae. The species was first described by Charles J. S. Bethune in 1865. It is found in North America from Nova Scotia to North Carolina in mountains, west to Texas, north to Saskatchewan, and occasionally Alberta. It is the only insect from the Calyptra genus to habitat North America.

The wingspan is 33–40 mm. The moth flies from June to September depending on the location.

The larvae feed on Thalictrum species.

References

External links

Original description: Proceedings of the Entomological Society of Philadelphia: 213.

Calpinae
Moths of North America
Moths described in 1865